"What Is Metaphysics?" is a lecture by the philosopher Martin Heidegger, first presented to the faculties of the University of Freiburg on July 24, 1929, as inaugural address.

English Translations
 R.F.C. Hull and Alan Crick in 1949, in Existence and Being, edited by Werner Brock (Chicago: Henry Regnery), pp. 325–349
 David Krell, in Basic Writings (1977) New York: Harper and Row (expanded edition, 1993), pp. 93–110
 Miles Groth, "What Is Metaphysics?"

See also
Metaphilosophy
Nothing

References

1929 speeches
Books about metaphilosophy
Books by Martin Heidegger
Books of lectures
German non-fiction books
Metaphysics books
Philosophy lectures
1929 in philosophy